My Wild West is the third album by American singer-songwriter Lissie, released on February 12, 2016. It is released under her own label, Lionboy, together with Thirty Tigers. In anticipation of the album, a music video for the promotional single "Hero" was released on November 5, 2015.

The album has three singles: the promotional single "Hero", the lead single "Don't You Give Up On Me" and "Daughters", a charity single for the association "Charity Water", that helps women working to get clean water. The album was Lissie's most critically  acclaimed with an average grade of 73% on Metacritic.

Critical reception 

My Wild West received generally favorable reviews, with several critics considering it as her best album.  Metacritic gave an average score of 73, based on 13 reviews.

The Q magazine said it was "undoubtly her best album yet" and gave 4 stars for the record.

The Fort Worth Star Telegram called it the 10th best album of 2016.

French paper "Marie Claire" wrote "My Wild West is primed to be a ray of light amidst the doldrums of winter". Meanwhile, "The Guardian" describes the album in these words : "My Wild West has a west-coast pop sheen to it, but touches of acoustic guitar and banjo suggest a country feel. This contrast mirrors the album’s theme".

Track listing

Charts

References 

2016 albums
Lissie albums